Pablo Martín may refer to:

Pablo Martín Arteaga (born 1965), Spanish  wheelchair basketball player
Pablo Martín Asuero (born 1967), Spanish orientalist
Pablo Pérez Álvarez (born Pablo Martín Pérez Álvarez; born 1969), Venezuelan politician
Pablo Martín Abal (born 1977), retired Argentine swimmer
Pablo Lima (Pablo Martín Lima Olid; born 1981), Uruguayan footballer
Pablo Batalla (Pablo Martín Batalla; born 1984), Argentine footballer
Pablo Martín Ledesma (born 1984), Argentine footballer
Pablo Miranda (Pablo Martín Miranda]] (born 1984), Argentine footballer
Pablo Bangardino (Pablo Martín Bangardino; born 1985), Argentine footballer
Pablo Martín (golfer) (born 1986), Spanish golfer
Martín Perafán (Pablo Martín Perafán; born 1987), Argentine footballer
Pablo Martín Ruiz (born 1987), Argentine footballer
Pablo Lacoste (Pablo Martín Lacoste Icardi; born 1988), Uruguayan footballer